The Uganda Microfinance Regulatory Authority (UMRA) is a government agency responsible for the licensing, supervision and regulation of Tier-4 micro finance institutions, money lenders, savings cooperatives and any money-lending institution with capital of less than USh500 million (US$140,000). Tier-4 institutions are those that do not accept financial deposits and are not under the supervision of the Bank of Uganda, the central bank and national banking regulator.

History
As far back as 2013, the government of Uganda announced its intentions to create a government agency to regulate money lenders who were not regulated by the central bank.

In May 2016, the Parliament of Uganda passed the Tier IV Microfinance Institutions Act, to take effect on 1 July 2017. The establishment of the UMRA was a key provision of the Act. UMRA is expected to promote a sound and sustainable non-banking financial institution’s sector and offer financial consumer protection and financial  inclusion, financial stability, and protection among the low income population in Uganda.

Overview
UMRA came into existence on 1 January 2017. The new institution regulates money lending between Ugandans and the hitherto non-regulated Tier-4 microfinance institutions and other private money lenders. It also authorizes the Minister of State for Microfinance, to set the interest rates which moneylenders should charge borrowers. On 8 December 2017, the State Minister of Finance for Microfinance, Haruna Kasolo Kyeyune inaugurated the board of directors, including its chairperson and executive director.

Administration
On 8 December 2017, the following seven individuals were appointed to the board of directors of the Uganda Microfinance Regulatory Authority:

 Jacqueline Mbabazi: Chairperson
 Edith Namugga Tusuubira: Executive Director
 Joyce Okello: Member
 Charles Olenyi: Member
 Ndyanabo Richard Kirungi: Member 
 Bob Barigye Bariyo: Member
 Naome Kibaaju: Member.

See also
Economy of Uganda
Uganda Ministry of Finance, Planning & Economic Development

References

External links 
Website of Uganda Microfinance Regulatory Authority (UMRA)

Government agencies of Uganda
Economy of Uganda
Organizations established in 2017
2017 establishments in Uganda
Organisations based in Kampala